Yuja Wang (born February 10, 1987) is a Chinese classical pianist who records on the  Deutsche Grammophon label.  She has released six CDs on with Deutsche Grammophon: Sonatas & Etudes in 2009; Transformation in 2010; Rachmaninov in 2011; and Fantasia, in March 2012.  She has also performed on the soundtrack to the film Summer in February.  A fifth Deutsche Grammophon album, released internationally in February, 2014, featured the Piano Concerto no. 2 of Sergei Prokofiev and Piano Concerto no. 3 of Sergei Rachmaninov, with Gustavo Dudamel conducting the Simón Bolívar Symphony Orchestra; and in another 2014 release for DGG, she partnered the violinist Leonidas Kavakos in the violin sonatas of Johannes Brahms.

Although there are reports that Wang released a debut CD in 1995, there is little information available about it.

In addition to her audio recordings, EuroArts has released a DVD on which Wang performs Sergei Prokofiev's Piano Concerto No. 3 in C major, with Abbado conducting.

Sonatas & Etudes (2009)

Sonatas & Etudes is Wang's first CD on general release.  It was recorded in November 2008 and released April 20, 2009.  It was nominated for the 2010 Grammy Award in the category Best Instrumental Soloist Performance (Without Orchestra).  It includes the following tracks:

Transformation (2010)

Transformation is Wang's second CD on general release.  It was released April 13, 2010 and includes the following tracks:

Rachmaninov (2011)

Rachmaninov is Wang's third CD on general release, on the Deutsche Grammophon label.  Its recording of Sergei Rachmaninov's Piano Concerto No. 2 features the Mahler Chamber Orchestra conducted by Claudio Abbado.  It was released February 25, 2011 and includes the following tracks:

Fantasia (2012)

Fantasia is Wang's fourth Deutsche Grammophon album. It was released on March 1, 2012 and includes the following tracks:

Piano Concertos / Rachmaninov, Prokofiev (2013)

Piano Concertos / Rachmaninov, Prokofiev is Wang's fifth Deutsche Grammophon album, scheduled for pre-release in the United States in October 2013, with a general international release January 3, 2014.  It includes Wang's performances of piano concertos composed by Sergei Rachmaninov and Sergei Prokofiev, and features the Simón Bolívar Symphony Orchestra of Venezuela, conducted by Gustavo Dudamel.  The album comprises the following tracks:

Summer in February (2013)
In addition to her solo classical albums, Wang was the featured soloist on the soundtrack for the 2013 film Summer in February.  The soundtrack to the film was released June 21, 2013, also by Deutsche Grammophon.

References

External links
 Yuja Wang at Discogs
 
 

Discographies of classical pianists